The CBG Centrum voor familiegeschiedenis (formerly called: Centraal Bureau voor Genealogie) (CBG) is the Dutch research centre for genealogical and heraldic studies. It is a non-profit foundation that has been founded on May 15, 1945, with the aim of bringing together a number of archive collections and making research of genealogy and related studies easier. The centre is located at the Prins Willem Alexanderhof in The Hague together with the National Archive.

The CBG publishes many books pertaining to genealogy, for instance the series Nederland's Adelsboek and Nederland's Patriciaat.

External links 
  Official website of the Centraal Bureau voor Genealogie

Genealogical libraries
Historiography of the Netherlands